Ágnes Pallag (born 2 September 1993) is a Hungarian female volleyball player, playing as an outside-spiker. She is part of the Hungary women's national volleyball team.

She competed at the 2015 Women's European Volleyball Championship, and 2021 Women's European Volleyball Championship.

On club level she played for Békéscsabai Röplabda SE, Vandœuvre Nancy Volley-Ball, RC Cannes, and VfB Suhl Lotto Thüringen.

References 

1993 births
Living people
Hungarian women's volleyball players
People from Nyíregyháza
Sportspeople from Szabolcs-Szatmár-Bereg County